Soy el mejor (In English "I am the best") is an Ecuadorian reality show produced and broadcast by TC Television. It is hosted by Gabriela Pazmiño. The program is also transmitted by Internet, the leader of the DUAL was Lissette Cedeño and is currently Fernanda Gallardo. On Tuesday, January 21, 2014 was premiered the first season, on Monday June 30 the second, and on Monday, April 6, 2015 the VIP season. In this reality the contestants demonstrate their talents in singing, dancing and acting. Also they are graded and evaluated by a strict judges.

Production

Casting 
The casting to define the sixteen members of the experience began at Mall del Sol located in Milagro (Ecuador), then spread to several cities. In the VIP season the contestants are mostly famous were revealed in Monday to Friday from two weeks before the premiere program, where live signed a contract and were subsequently released.

Format 
It is based almost challenges in which it is tested participants in their talent in singing, dancing and acting. To make these challenges, four crews, identified with a name and a color are formed, and beat on weekdays to avoid one of their nominated members to the danger zone is the step of removing the program so we can remain in competition. In the VIP season only two most beloved crews competing, this new format is based on the jury's ability to qualify participants as to their talent in dance.

Team

Judges 
The judge is composed of characters internationally, the same that will have to assess the presentations of each of the members of the program which will nominate and elect the removal step called  Danger Zone .

Current 

 Panama Drako – Dancer
 Ecuador Russia Juancho Lopez – Dancer
 Ecuador Yessenea Mendoza – Dancer

Previous 

 Ecuador Vito Muñoz – Sports journalist
 Spain Danni Ubeda – Professional Singer
 Colombia José Urrutia – TV host, actor and model
 Venezuela Manuel Larrad – Singer
 Ecuador Luis Tipán – Designer
 Ecuador Mariela Viteri – TV host
 Ecuador Sofia Caiche – Model and TV host
 Ecuador AU-D – Rap Singer
 Russia Julia Mamonova – Model and dancer
 Argentina Noelia Pompa – Dancer

Guests 
 Ecuador Jorge Luis del Hierro – Singer, songwriter and actor
 Ecuado} José Miguel Salem – Choreographer and dancer
 Ecuador Danilo Parra – Singer
 Urugua} Nestor Balbuena – Choreographer, entertainer and singer
 Ecuador Karen Gomez – Dancer

Teachers 
 Peru Diego Tosso – Dancer and choreographer
 Ecuador Andrés Garzón – Actor
 Ecuador Yanina Murga – Singer
 Ecuador Jimmy Mendoza – Dancer and choreographer

Crews 

In the initial stage of the competition, it has the form of competing in Cuadrillas, at its first and second season there were 4 crews which were: Black And White, Fuego, Kilates and Neones. At that crews must beat participants from Monday to Friday to not have one of its members to Danger Zone or Gala Night. Later in the season VIP which has a different format to the other one there were two crews which as in previous seasons had to face Monday through Friday, these crews are Fuego and Kilates.

Then in the box the Achievements for each crews in 3 seasons:

Seasons 

 Judge who retires during the season.

Awards and nominations 

Ecuadorian television shows
TC Televisión original programming